Everard Stanley Jackson (12 January 1914 – 20 September 1975) was a New Zealand rugby union player. A prop, Jackson represented East Coast, Hawke's Bay and Wellington at a provincial level, and was a member of the New Zealand national side, the All Blacks, from 1936 to 1938. He played 11 matches (including six internationals) for the All Blacks. He also played for New Zealand Māori in 1936.

Jackson was the son of British-born rugby player Fred Jackson, and Horowai Jackson (née Henderson) from Te Araroa. Horowai was the daughter of Everard Hannon Henderson, a British man, and his wife Kamaea Ngatoko of Ngāti Porou. Everard Jackson married Hineaka (Janey) Cunningham of Ngāti Kahungunu in Hastings in 1938. They had six children, Phil, Fred, Moana, Jacqui, Bob and Syd. Jackson also had another son, Bill Nepia. Bob Jackson married June Jackson, nee Batley, and they were the parents of Willie Jackson.

During World War II, Jackson served as an officer in the 28th (Māori) Battalion, and lost a leg as a result of wounds received in an artillery barrage.

References

External links
Everard Jackson record at Online Cenotaph

1914 births
1975 deaths
Ngāti Porou people
Rugby union players from Hastings, New Zealand
New Zealand rugby union players
New Zealand international rugby union players
Māori All Blacks players
Rugby union props
Hawke's Bay rugby union players
Wellington rugby union players
New Zealand military personnel of World War II
East Coast rugby union players
New Zealand amputees
Everard